The following is a list of massacres that have occurred in Russia (numbers may be approximate). For massacres that occurred in the Soviet Union, see List of massacres in the Soviet Union:

Pre-Soviet and Soviet Russia

Post-Soviet Russia

See also
Allegations of genocide of Ukrainians in the 2022 Russian invasion of Ukraine
List of massacres in the Soviet Union
Russian war crimes

References

Further reading
 
 
 
 

Russia
Massacres
 
Massacres
Russia crime-related lists